, also known as  or simply , is a Japanese light novel series, written by Shinkoshoto and illustrated by Huuka Kazabana. It began serialization online in December 2016 on the user-generated novel publishing website Shōsetsuka ni Narō. It was later acquired by SB Creative, who have published fifteen volumes since May 2017 under their GA Novel imprint. A manga adaptation with art by LIVER JAM&POPO has been serialized online since July 2017 via Square Enix's online manga magazine Manga UP!. It has been collected in nineteen tankōbon volumes. The manga is licensed in North America by Square Enix. An anime television series adaptation by J.C.Staff aired from January to March 2022.

A side story light novel series titled  has been published by SB Creative since September 2020 under their GA Bunko imprint with two volumes as of December 11, 2020. A manga adaptation of the side story by Yue Ling and Ponjea was also launched at the same time on Manga UP!. It has been collected in six tankōbon volumes as of March 11, 2022.

Synopsis
In a world of magic, the powers and future of a mage are predetermined at birth through so-called "Marks", four symbols that categorize a human's aptitude for magic. Lamenting the fact that his mark was considered ill-suited for combat and only useful for magic augmentation, an incredibly skilled sage decided to reincarnate thousands of years in the future. Reborn as Mathias Hildesheimr, a six-year-old boy and the third son of a duke's family, he attains the mark of close combat he always desired. Unfortunately, it is also discovered that mankind's knowledge of magic and swordsmanship has drastically deteriorated in this era; only shoddy magic equipment can be sporadically found, while even the most basic spells have been forgotten. To add insult to injury, his current mark, once hailed as the most powerful, is now viewed as the worst. When Mathias becomes 12 years old, his unrivaled swordsmanship lands him in the Second Royal Academy. Shattering prejudices, he promptly makes ripples in the academy and beyond. However, the former sage uncovers signs of dark forces working in the shadows, and with humanity weaker than ever, it is up to Mathias to thwart their evil plans.

Characters

Known as "Gaius" in his previous life around 5000+ years ago, he reincarnated himself as Matthias in order to obtain a new Crest by his Reincarnation magic, which would be better than his "First Crest". He was able to successfully achieve his goal upon reincarnation in the form of "Fourth Crest". His main goal in life is to gain power so that he could challenge and fight against the powerful Monsters in the Outer Space.

A daughter of the Abendroth House. She has a crush on Matthias since the first day they met and bears the "First Crest" just like Matthias's previous reincarnation.

The 3rd Daughter of the Lepucius House. She is a best friend of Lurie and bears the "Second Crest". Although her magic power is lower than Matthias and Lurie, she has been good with her archery skills.

Also known as the "Black Dragon Iris", she is one of the oldest and strongest Dragons still alive. She is the only one who knows Matthias's true identity after reunited thousand years later and decided to keep it a secret upon his request.

Media

Light novels
Shinkoshoto began serializing the series on the user-generated novel publishing website Shōsetsuka ni Narō in December 2016. In May 2017, it was acquired by SB Creative, who published the series with illustrations by Huuka Kazabana under their GA Novel imprint.

Manga
A manga adaptation of the light novel series by LIVER JAM&POPO began serialization in Square Enix's Manga UP! magazine on July 20, 2017. Square Enix Manga & Books licensed the manga for a North American release.

Anime
At the "GA Fes 2021" event livestream, it was announced that the series will be receiving an anime television series adaptation produced by NBCUniversal Entertainment Japan and animated by J.C.Staff. The series is directed by Noriaki Akitaya, with Hiroki Uchida overseeing the series' scripts. It aired from January 8 to March 26, 2022 on Tokyo MX, BS11, SUN, and AT-X. The opening theme is "Leap of faith" by fripSide, while the ending theme is "Day of Bright Sunshine" by Yuki Nakashima. Crunchyroll has licensed the series in select territories. Medialink licensed the series in South Asia, Southeast Asia, Oceania minus Australia and New Zealand.

On January 13, 2022, Crunchyroll announced that the series will receive an English dub, which premiered on February 19.

Mobile game
In December 2021, it was announced that a mobile game based on the series, titled Shikkaku Mon no Saikyō Kenja: The Ultimate Reincarnation, will be released on iOS and Android in 2022.

Reception
Rebecca Silverman from Anime News Network gave the first volume of the manga adaptation a C+. She praised the artwork, the hints the story gives about events that happened prior to the start of the story, and that the characters age properly, while criticizing it for being too generic and the pacing feeling rushed and uneven. The following volume earned a B−, with Rebecca Silverman praising the improvements made to the story and pacing, as well as the consistently good art, while criticizing it for still feeling a bit generic, one character getting less development, and some odd translation decisions.

See also
My Isekai Life — Another light novel series by the same author and illustrator.

References

External links
 at Shōsetsuka ni Narō 
 
 
 

2017 Japanese novels
2020 Japanese novels
2022 anime television series debuts
Anime and manga based on light novels
Book series introduced in 2016
Crunchyroll anime
Fiction about reincarnation
GA Bunko
Gangan Comics manga
Japanese webcomics
J.C.Staff
Light novels
Light novels first published online
Medialink
NBCUniversal Entertainment Japan
Shōnen manga
Shōsetsuka ni Narō
Webcomics in print